The 1993 New York Jets season was the 34th season for the team and the 24th in the National Football League. After the team had returned from its 1991 playoff season with a 4–12 1992 campaign, the Jets and coach Bruce Coslet looked to get back into the postseason.

The biggest acquisition for the Jets in the offseason was quarterback Boomer Esiason, whom New York acquired from the Cincinnati Bengals for a draft pick. The Jets also acquired running back Johnny Johnson from the Phoenix Cardinals, and he led the team in both rushing yards and pass receptions (821 yards rushing, 67 receptions). Brad Baxter led the Jets with seven rushing touchdowns and Rob Moore, a third-year receiver, caught passes for 843 yards. Second year tight end Johnny Mitchell caught six touchdown passes for a team high. On defense Jeff Lageman returned from his season-ending injury in 1992 to record 8.5 sacks to pace the defensive line, and defensive back Brian Washington added six interceptions.

After struggling early by only winning two of their first six games, the Jets began a winning streak by defeating their in-stadium rival New York Giants, 10–6 on Halloween. The streak reached five before the Indianapolis Colts snapped it with a 9–6 defeat of the Jets in Week 14. The Jets won again the next week by defeating the Washington Redskins by a 3–0 score, but lost their remaining three games to finish 8–8 and out of the playoffs.  After the season Coslet was fired and assistant Pete Carroll was promoted to head coach.

In Weeks 13, 14, and 15, the Jets played in games where the winning team did not reach 10 points. The Jets were 2–1 in those three games, with the other victory being a 6–0 win against the New England Patriots in Week 13. On the other hand, the Jets did not score more than ten points in five of their last six games, the only exception being a Week 16 loss to the Buffalo Bills, and only scored three total touchdowns in those games (two in the Week 16 loss and one in a Week 15 loss to the eventual Super Bowl champion Dallas Cowboys). For the third time in five seasons, the Jets were shut out in their season finale.

Offseason

NFL Draft

Personnel

Staff

Roster

Regular season

Schedule

Standings

Notes

References

External links
1993 statistics

New York Jets seasons
New York Jets
New York Jets season
20th century in East Rutherford, New Jersey
Meadowlands Sports Complex